Jan Karon is an American novelist who writes for both adults and young readers. She is the author of the New York Times-bestselling Mitford novels, featuring Father Timothy Kavanagh, an Episcopal priest, and the fictional village of Mitford. Her most recent Mitford novel, To Be Where You Are, was released in September 2017. She has been designated a lay Canon for the Arts in the Episcopal Diocese of Quincy (Illinois) by Keith Ackerman, Episcopal Bishop of Quincy, and in May 2000 she was awarded the Degree, Doctor of Humane Letters honoris causa by Nashotah House, a theological seminary in Nashotah Wisconsin. {“More from Mitford” Volume 4, Number 10, Fall 2000.} In 2015, she was awarded the Library of Virginia's Literary Lifetime Achievement Award.

Early life
Jan Karon was born on March 14, 1937, in the Blue Ridge foothills town of Lenoir, North Carolina  as Janice Meredith Wilson. She was named after the novel Janice Meredith.  Before she was 4, her parents split up and left her with her maternal grandparents on a farm a few miles from Lenoir in Hudson, North Carolina. Her mother Wanda, who was 15 at Jan's birth, went to Charlotte. Her father, Robert Wilson, joined the Royal Canadian Air Force.

At age 12, Jan moved to Charlotte to rejoin her mother, who had married Toby Setzer and had two more children. She dropped out of school in ninth grade, at 14, and married Robert Freeland in South Carolina, where girls her age could do so legally. Freeland, who was five years older, worked at a Charlotte tire store, while Jan worked in a clothing store.  At age 15, she gave birth to her only child, Candace Freeland.

Jan and Freeland's marriage was troubled from the beginning, and tragedy rocked it further. While Freeland was sitting in a car with one of his brothers and one or more friends, a gun was handed through the window and went off. The bullet punctured one of Robert Freeland's lungs and chipped his spine, nearly killing him and leaving him paralyzed.  Jan was distraught, the marriage suffered, and she filed for divorce.

Career 
Janice, age 18, was on her own with her daughter Candace. She took a receptionist job at Walter J. Klein Co., a Charlotte advertising agency.  Bored with answering the phone, she submitted writing examples. Klein soon had her writing advertising copy.  In her early 20s, Jan married Bill Orth, a Duke Power chemist.  Orth was active with her in theater and the Unitarian Church.  By the late 1960s, Jan and Orth were divorced, and she married a third time, to Arthur Karon, a clothing salesman, and became Jan Karon.  Arthur moved his wife and her daughter to Berkeley, California, where they lived for three years.

In California, Karon practiced Judaism, but she did not convert from Christianity. Karon wanted to be a novelist, and tried all through the 1960s.  When Karon's third marriage ended she returned to Charlotte and again worked in advertising. By 1985, Karon had moved to Raleigh and the McKinney & Silver advertising agency, where she had worked in the late 1970s.  Karon and Michael Winslow, a Mckinney designer, collaborated on a tourism campaign, interviewing artisans, musicians and others for print ads aimed at showing that North Carolina had other attractions besides theme parks and big hotels. One ad featured mountain musicians under the headline, "The Best Place to Hear Old English Music Is 3,000 Miles West of London." The campaign, which ran in National Geographic and other magazines, won the 1987 Kelly Award, the print advertising equivalent of the Academy Award.  Karon and Winslow split a $100,000 prize.

In 1988, Karon quit her job, traded her Mercedes for a used Toyota and moved to Blowing Rock, North Carolina.  In Blowing Rock, Karon began writing Father Tim stories for the Blowing Rocket newspaper.  An agent circulated Karon's fiction to publishers, but got only rejections. In 1994, Karon herself placed her work with a small religious publisher, which brought out a volume titled At Home in Mitford.  Karon kept writing, and employed her marketing skills to promote her book, writing press releases and cold-calling bookstores. But the publisher offered limited distribution and little marketing muscle of its own. Two more Mitford novels appeared. Sales remained modest.  Then Karon's friend Mary Richardson, mother of Carolina Panthers' owner Jerry Richardson, showed At Home in Mitford to Nancy Olson, owner of Quail Ridge Books & Music in Raleigh.  Olson felt there was a large audience looking for clean, well-written fiction. She sent Karon's book to a New York agent friend, who got it to Carolyn Carlson, an editor at Viking Penguin and daughter of a Lutheran minister.  Carlson faced opposition at Viking Penguin, a mainstream publisher unused to Christian fiction. But in 1996 the New York firm brought out Karon's first three titles as paperbacks. By the late 1990s, Karon's books were New York Times bestsellers.

In 2021 Karon founded The Mitford Museum in her former elementary school in Hudson, NC. The museum features family history as well as a wealth of information about her writing. Happy Endings Bookstore sells signed copies of her books along with Mitford-related items. The museum is open Wednesday-Saturday from 10 a.m. to 4 p.m.

Personal life 
In 2000, Karon left Blowing Rock and moved to Albemarle County, Virginia, where she restored a historic 1816 home and 100 acre farm, Esmont Farm, built by Dr. Charles Cocke (who served in both houses of the Virginia General Assembly before the American Civil War).

Works

The Mitford Years 
At Home in Mitford (1994)
A Light in the Window (1995)
These High, Green Hills (1996)
Out to Canaan (1997)
A New Song (1999)
A Common Life: The Wedding Story (2001) — takes place after A Light in the Window
In This Mountain (2002)
Shepherds Abiding (2003)
Light from Heaven (2005)
Home to Holly Springs (2007)
In the Company of Others (2010)
Somewhere Safe with Somebody Good (2014)
Come Rain or Come Shine (2015)
To Be Where You Are (2017)

Mitford companion books 

Patches of Godlight: Father Tim's Favorite Quotes (2001)
The Mitford Snowmen (2001)
Esther's Gift: A Mitford Christmas Story (2002)
Jan Karon's Mitford Cookbook and Kitchen Reader (2004)
A Continual Feast: Words of Comfort and Celebration, collected by Father Tim (2005)
The Mitford Bedside Companion (2006)
Bathed in Prayer: Father Tim's Prayers, Sermons, and Reflections from the Mitford Series (2018)

Children's books 
Miss Fannie's Hat (1998)
Jeremy: The Tale of an Honest Bunny (2000)
Jan Karon Presents: Violet Comes to Stay (2006)
Jan Karon Presents: Violet Goes to the Country (2007)

Other books 
The Trellis and the Seed: A Book of Encouragement for All Ages (2003)

Short works 
"The Day Aunt Maude Left" in Response 1.4 (1961)

Archive 
Jan Karon's papers are held at the Albert and Shirley Small Special Collections Library at the University Virginia, and regular additions are made to document Karon's new works. The papers include preparatory materials for all of Karon's books, personal correspondence and papers, extensive papers related to her historical restoration of Esmont Farm, and correspondence with readers.

References

External links
Official site for the Mitford series author
December 6, 2005 lecture given by Karon at the National Cathedral, entitled Wrestling with and Writing from the Heart
Current biography at Penguin
The Mitford Museum

1937 births
Living people
American children's writers
American Christian writers
20th-century American novelists
People from Lenoir, North Carolina
Novelists from North Carolina
American Episcopalians
21st-century American novelists
American women novelists
20th-century American women writers
21st-century American women writers
People from Blowing Rock, North Carolina
American women non-fiction writers
20th-century American non-fiction writers
21st-century American non-fiction writers